Biomedical Research  is a quarterly peer-reviewed medical journal covering research on biomedical sciences and experimental medicine. The editors-in-chief are Jin Ding (Eastern Hepatobiliary Surgery Hospital, Shanghai, China) and Ken Ichiro Inoue (University of Shizuoka). The journal was established in 1990 and is now published by Allied Academies, which is included on Jeffrey Beall's list of "potential, possible, or probable predatory publishers". Before being acquired by Allied Academies, the journal was published by Andrew John Publishing.

Abstracting and indexing
The journal is abstracted and indexed in the following bibliographic databases:
Academic Search Premier
Chemical Abstracts Core
EMBASE
Scopus

According to the Journal Citation Reports, the journal has a 2016 impact factor of 0.219. This was its last impact factor, since the journal was dropped from Clarivate Analytics indexes in 2017.

References

External links 
 

Allied Academies academic journals
Publications established in 1990
General medical journals
Quarterly journals
Open access journals
English-language journals